Sphenomorphus multisquamatus  is a species of skink found in Indonesia and Malaysia.

References

multisquamatus
Reptiles described in 1958
Taxa named by Robert F. Inger
Reptiles of Borneo